Events from the year 1628 in Sweden

Incumbents
 Monarch – Gustaf II Adolf

Events

 August 4 – Thirty Years' War: With the help of Danish and Swedish reinforcements, Stralsund is able to resist Wallenstein's siege until the landing of a Danish army, led by Christian IV of Denmark, forces Wallenstein to raise the siege and move his army to confront the new threat.
 August 10 – The Swedish 64 gun sailing ship Vasa sinks on her maiden voyage in the Stockholm harbor.
 Foundation of the Lantmäteriet.
 The Livrustkammaren is founded. 
 The King bans all pilgrimages to the visionary Margareta i Kumla.
 Christian Thum appointed director of the royal court theater.

Births

 David Klöcker Ehrenstrahl, painter  (died 1698) 
 Märta Allertz, royal lover  (died after 1677) 
 Gustaf Düben, organist and composer (died 1690)

Deaths

 Amalia von Hatzfeld, countess, governor of Raseborg  (born 1560)

References

 
Years of the 17th century in Sweden
Sweden